Aaron Wilson may refer to:
Aaron Wilson (bowls) (born 1991), Australian bowler
Aaron Wilson (director), Australian film director
Aaron Wilson (lacrosse) (born 1980), Canadian lacrosse player
Aaron Wilson (priest) (1589–1643), Anglican clergyman

See also
Aaron Wilson House, a historic home in New York state